Southport Courthouse is the Gold Coast's major courthouse. It houses courtrooms and chambers for part of the District Court of Queensland, which has jurisdiction to hear criminal offences with penalties of less than 20 years imprisonment, some criminal offences with penalties of over 20 years imprisonment, and civil matters up to A$750,000.

It is located in the Southport legal district on the corner of Davenport and Hinze Street. A subsidiary Magistrates' Court of Queensland is located at Coolangatta.

The building was designed by ABM Architects.  When completed the building housed five district courts, nine magistrates courts, a central registry, accommodation for 13 magistrates, six judges, and a watchhouse which contains cells for 68 detainees.

Court complex extensions 
Queensland Premier Rob Borbidge opened the $25.9 million Southport Court extensions and watch house on February 2, 1998.

Judges 
Southport's judges are:
Judge J.E. Newton - 25 February 1991
Judge C.F Wall Q.C - 11 September 1996
Judge M. E. Rackemann - 12 January 2004
Judge F Kingham  -17 July 2006.

References

External links
Queensland Courts
National Library of Australia - Southport Court House and Police Station

Buildings and structures on the Gold Coast, Queensland
Courthouses in Queensland
Southport, Queensland
1998 establishments in Australia
Government buildings completed in 1998